Logan High School is the high school for the town of Logan, West Virginia under the jurisdiction of Logan County Schools. Its current campus was built in 1957. The school campus sits on Hatfield Island, at the confluence of the Guyandotte River and Island Creek. The island is shared with an elementary school, middle school, and the town's public library.

Notable alumni
 Richard Ojeda, state senator

References

Educational institutions established in 1911
Public high schools in West Virginia
Schools in Logan County, West Virginia
1911 establishments in West Virginia